Armatocereus cartwrightianus is a species of Armatocereus from Ecuador and Peru.

References

External links
 
 

cartwrightianus
Flora of Ecuador